Marasmarcha rhypodactylus is a moth of the family Pterophoridae. It is found in Russia, Turkey, Lebanon, Kazakhstan, Iraq and Iran.

The wingspan is 24–27 mm.

References

Moths described in 1870
Exelastini